Sanpaolo IMI S.p.A. was an Italian banking and insurance conglomerate, based in Turin. It employed about 44,000 people and had about 7 million customers.

On 24 August 2006 a merger with Banca Intesa was announced, which on 1 December 2006 was approved by the joint meetings of the shareholders of Banca Intesa and Sanpaolo IMI. On 2 January 2007 the merger went into effect, thereby creating Intesa Sanpaolo, now the largest Italian bank and one of the largest in the Eurozone.

The new banking company based in Turin and is administered under the "two-tier model", with the presence of a Supervisory Board and a Board of Management. This was the first application of this model in a major Italian company.

History
Sanpaolo IMI was formed by many merger of banks, which in 1998 Istituto Bancario San Paolo di Torino merged with Istituto Mobiliare Italiano.

In 2002, the group absorbed Cardine Banca, a short lived holding company that consist of Cassa di Risparmio in Bologna, Cassa di Risparmio di Padova e Rovigo, Cassa di Risparmio di Venezia, Cassa di Risparmio di Udine e Pordenone, Cassa di Risparmio di Gorizia and Banca Popolare dell'Adriatico.

Activities
Sanpaolo IMI had about 3,200 local offices where private, business and retail banking activities take place.
It also managed savings and retirement funds.

Management
The last honorary president was Luigi Arcuti. The last president was Enrico Salza, the last managing director was Alfonso Iozzo, the last general manager was Pietro Modiano.

Subsidiaries
Before the merger the following banks were the subsidiaries of the group:
 Banca dell'Adriatico
 Cassa di Risparmio del Veneto
 Cassa di Risparmio di Venezia
 Cassa di Risparmio in Bologna
 Cassa dei Risparmi di Forlì e della Romagna
 Neos Finance
 Banco di Napoli
 Banca IMI
 Friulcassa

Ownership
Total shares: 1,875,087,936
Total ordinary shares: 1,590,903,918 
Total preferred shares:284,184,018
par value: €2.88 each.
Before the merger, on 31 December 2006 the shareholders were (ordinary and preference shares):
 Compagnia di San Paolo 14.19%
 Fondazione Cariparo 7.02%
 Fondazione Carisbo 5.54%
 Giovanni Agnelli e C. 4.96%
 Banco Santander 3.63%
 Carlo Tassara 2.51%
 Assicurazioni Generali 2.47%

ownership ratio below 2% was not required to disclose ownership to CONSOB, based on other sources, know institution owner were :
 Fondazione di Venezia 1.47%
 Ente Cassa di Risparmio di Firenze 1.11%
 Fondazione Monte dei Paschi di Siena 0.84%

References

External links

Sanpaolo Italy
Sanpaolo IMI Bank Romania

 
Defunct banks of Italy
Italian companies established in 1998
Banks established in 1998
2007 disestablishments in Italy
Banks disestablished in 2007
History of Intesa Sanpaolo
Companies formerly listed on the Borsa Italiana
Banco Santander